This is a list of released and upcoming video games that are developed in France. The list is sorted by game title, platform, year of release and their developer. This list does not include serious games.

Video games developed in France
France
Video games developed